Streetwise priests are Roman Catholic priests who exercise their spiritual mandate by living in structures in direct contact with the "street", which is their mission land. Historical streetwise priests include Philip Neri (1515–1595) and John Bosco (1815–1888).

Recently, the expression came to denote priests with reformist ideas, especially those involved in reform movements for social justice in a Christian context through service to the poor and marginalized. Their work covers various areas, such as education, marginalization, imprisonment, development cooperation, drug addictions, disabilities, orphans and abandoned children, prostitution, and homelessness.

In many cases, streetwise priests form groups, associations, or communities, especially inclusive of laity.
Through 2008, debates and conflicts with ecclesiastical hierarchy existed regarding Catholic social teaching and implementing the Second Vatican Council's doctrine.

Notable streetwise priests 

Below is a list of priests who have been described  as streetwise.

Africa 
 Father Jean-Baptiste Malenge Kalunzu,

Central America 
 Oscar Romero, El Salvador
 Padre Gadalupe, James Carney, American missionary murdered in Honduras 1983
 Juan José Gerardi Conedera, Guatemala

South America 
 Padre Cacho, Uruguay
 Don Gonzalo Aemilius, Uruguay
 Monsignor Hélder Câmara, Bishop
 Don Júlio Lancellotti, Brazil
 Father Alfredo Souza Dorea, Brazil

North America 
 Larry Rosebaugh, O.M.I.
 Greg Boyle
 Michael Pfleger

France 
 Abbé Pierre (1912–2007)
 Father Guy Gilbert (b. 1935)
 Fr. Pedro Meca
 Father Axel
 Father Jean Tessier
 Father Jean-Philippe Chauveau
 Abbé Fabrice Loiseau

Germany 
 Franz Meurer

India 
 Barnabe D'Souza, Salesian of Don Bosco, Mumbai Province.
 Bosco Pereira, Salesian of Don Bosco, Mumbai Province (1950-2013) founder of Shelter Don Bosco
 George Kollashany, Salesian of Don Bosco, Bangalore Province, Founder of BOSCO a Non Governmental Organisation working with the Young At Risk in the city of Bangalore since 1980.    
 George Miranda, Salesian of Don Bosco, Mumbai Province.
 Gregory Almeida, Salesian of Don Bosco, Mumbai Province, currently directory of Don Bosco Bal Prafulta
 Lester Fernandes, Salesian of Don Bosco, Mumbai Province.
 Monty Rodrigues, Salesian of Don Bosco, Mumbai Province.
 Thomas Koshy, Salesian of Don Bosco, Hyderabad Province, director of the Navajeevan Bala Bhaven.
 Xavier Devdas, Salesian of Don Bosco, Mumbai Province.

Italy 
 Don Antonio Acciai (1924 – 1974), Genoa
 Don Vinicio Albanesi (b. 1943),  Comunità di Capodarco
 Don Franco Baroni (1934–1985), OASNI (Care for Nomads)
 Don Mimmo Battaglia (b. 1963), Centro Calabrese di Solidarietà, Catanzaro
 Monsignor Tonino Bello (1935–1993), Bishop
 Don Oreste Benzi (1925–2007), Comunità Papa Giovanni XXIII
 Don Giancarlo Bertagnolli (don Geki) (b. 1933), Associazione La Strada – Der Weg, Bolzano
 Don Albino Bizzotto (b. 1939), Beati i Costruttori di Pace
 fratel Ettore (Ettore Boschini) (1928–2004)
 Monsignor Giancarlo Bregantini (b. 1948), Bishop
 Don Marcellino Brivio (b. 1951), Carcere di Opera
 Don Luigi Ciotti (b. 1945), Gruppo Abele and Libera
 Don Dante Clauser (1923–2013), Punto d’incontro, Trento
 Don Virginio Colmegna (b. 1945), Casa della Carità, Milano
 Don Danilo Cubattoli (don Cuba) (1922–2006)
 Father Angelo Cupini (b. 1939), Comunità di via Gaggio, Lecco
 Don Peppino Diana (1958–1994), priest against the Camorra
 Don Roberto Dichiera (b. 1974), Comunità Nuovi Orizzonti
 Father Carmelo Di Giovanni (b. 1944), St Peter's Church, London
 Don Fortunato Di Noto (b. 1963), Associazione Meter
 Don Pierluigi Di Piazza (b. 1947), Centro Ernesto Balducci, Zugliano
 Don Andrea Gallo (1928–2013), Comunità di San Benedetto al Porto
 Don Fabio Giacometti (1967–2011), Meldola,
 Father Mario Golesano (b. 1949), Fondazione Don Giuseppe Puglisi
 Don Aniello Manganiello (b. 1953), priest against the Camorra
 Don Edoardo Medori, Comunità San Benedetto, Livorno
 Don Luigi Melesi (b. 1933), Carcere di San Vittore, Milano
 Don Luigi Merola (b. 1972), priest against the Camorra
 Don Matteo Migliore (b. 1937), Torino
 Don Lorenzo Milani (1923–1967), Scuola di Barbiana
 Don Franco Monterubbianesi (b. 1931), Comunità di Capodarco
 Don Fredo Olivero, Torino
 Don Giacomo Piazza, Comunità Progetto Sud di Lamezia Terme
 Don Mario Picchi, Centro italiano di solidarietà
 Father Antonio Poletti, Caserta
 Don Valentino Porcile
 Don Giuseppe Provitera, Secondigliano
 Don Pino Puglisi (1937–1993), victim of the Sicilian Mafia
 Don Innocenzo Ricci
 Don Gino Rigoldi, Istituto penale per minorenni "Beccaria" (youth detention centre)
 Father Giuseppe Russo, Palermo
 Don Alessandro Santoro, Comunità delle Piagge
 Don Roberto Sardelli, Scuola 725 all'Acquedotto Felice, Rome
 Don Luciano Scaccaglia, Parma
 Don Vincenzo Sorce, Casa Famiglia Rosetta,
 Don Antonio Terlizzi (-2011)
 Don Mario Vatta, Comunità di San Martino al Campo
 Father Alex Zanotelli
 Don Armando Zappolini
 Don Giuliano Zattarin

See also 

 Worker-Priest

References

Bibliography 
 Roberto Beretta e Giovanni Gazzaneo, Preti di strada: le frontiere dell'emarginazione e della speranza raccontate dai più noti sacerdoti anti-droga, con prefazione di Furio Colombo, SEI, Torino, 1995
 Candido Cannavò, Pretacci: storie di uomini che portano il Vangelo sul marciapiede, Rizzoli, Milano, 2008
 Mimmo Battaglia e Virginio Colmegna, I poveri hanno sempre ragione: storie di preti di strada, Cittadella editrice, Assisi, 2010
 Pierfilippo Pozzi (cur.), Dov'è Dio: il Vangelo quotidiano secondo quattro preti di strada, Einaudi, Torino, 2011

External links 
 Federazione italiana Organismi per le Persone Senza Fissa Dimora
 CNCA – Coordinamento nazionale comunità di accoglienza
 RAI, "La storia siamo noi", Preti di strada – Una mano tesa contro la disperazione (Don Gallo a Genova, Don Alessandro Santoro a Firenze, Don Virginio Colmegna a Milano, Padre Antonio Poletti a Caserta

Roman Catholic orders and societies
Christian theological movements
Religion and politics
Liberation theology
Catholic social teaching
Christian radicalism